Independent School League or ISL may refer to:
 Independent School League (Illinois), a group of nine Chicago-area preparatory schools
 Independent School League (New England), a group of 16 New England preparatory schools
 Independent School League (Washington, D.C. area), a group of 17 Washington, D.C. preparatory schools
 Interscholastic League of Honolulu, a group of Hawaiian private schools

See also
 ISL (disambiguation)